Marc Botenga (born 29 December 1980) is a Belgian politician of the Workers' Party of Belgium (PVDA-PTB). In 2019, he was elected as member of the Ninth European Parliament as part of the European United Left–Nordic Green Left (GUE/NGL) party group. Botenga is the first MEP to be chosen for the PVDA-PTB.

Biography

Marc Botenga studied law at the Université libre de Bruxelles. In 1998 he engaged in the movement advocating for the step-down of then Belgian Minister of the Interior Louis Tobback, following the assassination of asylum seeker Semira Adamu by police officers. Later, he participated in workers' mobilization against the close-down of the Forges de Clabecq iron works.

In the wake of the European debt crisis beginning in 2010, Marc Botenga began to become more involved in European politics, participating in actions of political support for Greece. In 2016, he became the political advisor of the European GUE/NGL parliamentary group. He is a member of the Committee on Industry, Research and Energy and the delegation to the ACP-EU Joint Parliamentary Assembly.

Member of the European Parliament
Marc Botenga has been a Member of the European Parliament since the 2019 elections with the GUE/NGL group. He has since been serving as member on the Committee on Industry, Research and Energy and the Delegation to the ACP-EU Joint Parliamentary Assembly. He supports the European Citizens' Initiative Right to Cure.

On 15 September 2022, Botenga voted against condemning President Daniel Ortega of Nicaragua for human rights violations, in particular the arrest of Bishop Rolando Álvarez. 

After the 2022 Russian invasion of Ukraine, Botenga partook in peace demonstrations and actions, condemned the invasion and called for diplomatic resolution. On 24 November 2022, he voted against a resolution condemning the Russian Federation as a state sponsor of terrorism.

Botenga, spoke at a European parliamentary session following December 12th, 2022 condemning the murder of 16 year-old Jana Zakarna, at her rooftop in Jenin, West Bank by IDF soldiers. The murder erupted response from Palestinian and left-wing solidarity movements as Israeli forces claimed her murder was “probably an accident”. Botenga accused the European Union of turning a blind eye towards Israel’s violence and occupation against the Palestinians, despite Europe’s strong stance for equal human rights.

See also
 Workers' Party of Belgium
 European United Left–Nordic Green Left

References

MEPs for Belgium 2019–2024
Workers' Party of Belgium MEPs
1980 births
Living people
Workers' Party of Belgium politicians